Usaghade is a Lower Cross River language of Cameroon, with a small number of speakers on the border in Nigeria.

References

Lower Cross River languages
Languages of Cameroon
Languages of Nigeria